Johannesteijsmannia is a genus of four species of palms found in tropical rainforests of the Malay Peninsula, Borneo and northern Sumatra. They are fan palms, usually growing without a trunk. The genus was named in honor of Johannes Elias Teijsmann, a Dutch botanist who was director of the Bogor Botanical Gardens from 1830 to 1869.

Species
Species include:

References

 
Arecaceae genera